Microfluidics refers to a system that manipulates a small amount of fluids ((10-9 to 10-18 liters) using small channels with sizes ten to hundreds micrometres. It is a multidisciplinary field that involves molecular analysis, biodefence, molecular biology, and microelectronics. It has practical applications in the design of systems that process low volumes of fluids to achieve multiplexing, automation, and high-throughput screening. Microfluidics emerged in the beginning of the 1980s and is used in the development of inkjet printheads, DNA chips, lab-on-a-chip technology, micro-propulsion, and micro-thermal technologies.

Typically, micro means one of the following features:

 Small volumes (μL, nL, pL, fL)
 Small size
 Low energy consumption
 Microdomain effects

Typically microfluidic systems transport, mix, separate, or otherwise process fluids. Various applications rely on passive fluid control using capillary forces, in the form of capillary flow modifying elements, akin to flow resistors and flow accelerators. In some applications, external actuation means are additionally used for a directed transport of the media. Examples are rotary drives applying centrifugal forces for the fluid transport on the passive chips. Active microfluidics refers to the defined manipulation of the working fluid by active (micro) components such as micropumps or microvalves. Micropumps supply fluids in a continuous manner or are used for dosing. Microvalves determine the flow direction or the mode of movement of pumped liquids. Often, processes normally carried out in a lab are miniaturised on a single chip, which enhances efficiency and mobility, and reduces sample and reagent volumes.

Microscale behaviour of fluids

The behaviour of fluids at the microscale can differ from "macrofluidic" behaviour in that factors such as surface tension, energy dissipation, and fluidic resistance start to dominate the system. Microfluidics studies how these behaviours change, and how they can be worked around, or exploited for new uses.

At small scales (channel size of around 100 nanometers to 500 micrometers) some interesting and sometimes unintuitive properties appear. In particular, the Reynolds number (which compares the effect of the momentum of a fluid to the effect of viscosity) can become very low. A key consequence is co-flowing fluids do not necessarily mix in the traditional sense, as flow becomes laminar rather than turbulent; molecular transport between them must often be through diffusion.

High specificity of chemical and physical properties (concentration, pH, temperature, shear force, etc.) can also be ensured resulting in more uniform reaction conditions and higher grade products in single and multi-step reactions.

Various kinds of microfluidic flows
Microfluidic flows need only be constrained by geometrical length scale - the modalities and methods used to achieve such a geometrical constraint are highly dependent on the targeted application. Traditionally, microfluidic flows have been generated inside closed channels with the channel cross section being in the order of 10 μm x 10 μm. Each of these methods has its own associated techniques to maintain robust fluid flow which have matured over several years.

Open microfluidics 
The behavior of fluids and their control in open microchannels was pioneered around 2005  and applied in air-to-liquid sample collection  and chromatography. In open microfluidics, at least one boundary of the system is removed, exposing the fluid to air or another interface (i.e. liquid). Advantages of open microfluidics include accessibility to the flowing liquid for intervention, larger liquid-gas surface area, and minimized bubble formation.  Another advantage of open microfluidics is the ability to integrate open systems with surface-tension driven fluid flow, which eliminates the need for external pumping methods such as peristaltic or syringe pumps. Open microfluidic devices are also easy and inexpensive to fabricate by milling, thermoforming, and hot embossing. In addition, open microfluidics eliminates the need to glue or bond a cover for devices, which could be detrimental to capillary flows. Examples of open microfluidics include open-channel microfluidics, rail-based microfluidics, paper-based, and thread-based microfluidics.  Disadvantages to open systems include susceptibility to evaporation, contamination, and limited flow rate.

Continuous-flow microfluidics

Continuous flow microfluidics rely on the control of a steady state liquid flow through narrow channels or porous media predominantly by accelerating or hindering fluid flow in capillary elements. In paper based microfluidics, capillary elements can be achieved through the simple variation of section geometry. In general, the actuation of liquid flow is implemented either by external pressure sources, external mechanical pumps, integrated mechanical micropumps, or by combinations of capillary forces and electrokinetic mechanisms.  Continuous-flow microfluidic operation is the mainstream approach because it is easy to implement and less sensitive to protein fouling problems. Continuous-flow devices are adequate for many well-defined and simple biochemical applications, and for certain tasks such as chemical separation, but they are less suitable for tasks requiring a high degree of flexibility or fluid manipulations. These closed-channel systems are inherently difficult to integrate and scale because the parameters that govern flow field vary along the flow path making the fluid flow at any one location dependent on the properties of the entire system. Permanently etched microstructures also lead to limited reconfigurability and poor fault tolerance capability. Computer-aided design automation approaches for continuous-flow microfluidics have been proposed in recent years to alleviate the design effort and to solve the scalability problems.

Process monitoring capabilities in continuous-flow systems can be achieved with highly sensitive microfluidic flow sensors based on MEMS technology, which offers resolutions down to the nanoliter range.

Droplet-based microfluidics

Droplet-based microfluidics is a subcategory of microfluidics in contrast with continuous microfluidics; droplet-based microfluidics manipulates discrete volumes of fluids in immiscible phases with low Reynolds number and laminar flow regimes. Interest in droplet-based microfluidics systems has been growing substantially in past decades. Microdroplets allow for handling miniature volumes (μl to fl) of fluids conveniently, provide better mixing, encapsulation, sorting, and sensing, and suit high throughput experiments. Exploiting the benefits of droplet-based microfluidics efficiently requires a deep understanding of droplet generation  to perform various logical operations such as droplet manipulation, droplet sorting, droplet merging, and droplet breakup.

Digital microfluidics

Alternatives to the above closed-channel continuous-flow systems include novel open structures, where discrete, independently controllable droplets
are manipulated on a substrate using electrowetting. Following the analogy of digital microelectronics, this approach is referred to as digital microfluidics. Le Pesant et al. pioneered the use of electrocapillary forces to move droplets on a digital track. The "fluid transistor" pioneered by Cytonix also played a role. The technology was subsequently commercialised by Duke University. By using discrete unit-volume droplets,  a microfluidic function can be reduced to a set of repeated basic operations, i.e., moving one unit of fluid over one unit of distance. This "digitisation" method facilitates the use of a hierarchical and cell-based approach for microfluidic biochip design. Therefore, digital microfluidics offers a flexible and scalable system architecture as well as high fault-tolerance capability. Moreover, because each droplet can be controlled independently, these systems also have dynamic reconfigurability, whereby groups of unit cells in a microfluidic array can be reconfigured to change their functionality during the concurrent execution of a set of bioassays. Although droplets are manipulated in confined microfluidic channels, since the control on droplets is not independent, it should not be confused as "digital microfluidics". One common actuation method for digital microfluidics is electrowetting-on-dielectric (EWOD). Many lab-on-a-chip applications have been demonstrated within the digital microfluidics paradigm using electrowetting. However, recently other techniques for droplet manipulation have also been demonstrated using magnetic force, surface acoustic waves, optoelectrowetting, mechanical actuation,  etc.

Paper-based microfluidics 

Paper-based microfluidic devices fill a growing niche for portable, cheap, and user-friendly medical diagnostic systems. 
Paper based microfluidics rely on the phenomenon of capillary penetration in porous media. To tune fluid penetration in porous substrates such as paper in two and three dimensions, the pore structure, wettability and geometry of the microfluidic devices can be controlled while the viscosity and evaporation rate of the liquid play a further significant role. Many such devices feature hydrophobic barriers on hydrophilic paper that passively transport aqueous solutions to outlets where biological reactions take place. Paper-based microfluidics are considered as portable point-of-care biosensors used in a remote setting where advanced medical diagnostic tools are not accessible. Current applications include portable glucose detection and environmental testing, with hopes of reaching areas that lack advanced medical diagnostic tools.

Particle detection microfluidics 
One application area that has seen significant academic effort and some commercial effort is in the area of particle detection in fluids. Particle detection of small fluid-borne particles down to about 1 μm in diameter is typically done using a Coulter counter, in which electrical signals are generated when a weakly-conducting fluid such as in saline water is passed through a small (~100 μm diameter) pore, so that an electrical signal is generated that is directly proportional to the ratio of the particle volume to the pore volume. The physics behind this is relatively simple, described in a classic paper by DeBlois and Bean, and the implementation first described in Coulter's original patent. This is the method used to e.g. size and count erythrocytes (red blood cells [wiki]) as well as leukocytes (white blood cells) for standard blood analysis. The generic term for this method is resistive pulse sensing (RPS); Coulter counting is a trademark term. However, the RPS method does not work well for particles below 1 μm diameter, as the signal-to-noise ratio falls below the reliably detectable limit, set mostly by the size of the pore in which the analyte passes and the input noise of the first-stage amplifier.

The limit on the pore size in traditional RPS Coulter counters is set by the method used to make the pores, which while a trade secret, most likely uses traditional mechanical methods. This is where microfluidics can have an impact: The lithography-based production of microfluidic devices, or more likely the production of reusable molds for making microfluidic devices using a molding process, is limited to sizes much smaller than traditional machining. Critical dimensions down to 1 μm are easily fabricated, and with a bit more effort and expense, feature sizes below 100 nm can be patterned reliably as well. This enables the inexpensive production of pores integrated in a microfluidic circuit where the pore diameters can reach sizes of order 100 nm, with a concomitant reduction in the minimum particle diameters by several orders of magnitude.

As a result there has been some university-based development of microfluidic particle counting and sizing  with the accompanying commercialization of this technology. This method has been termed microfluidic resistive pulse sensing (MRPS).

Microfluidic-assisted magnetophoresis 
One major area of application for microfluidic devices is the separation and sorting of different fluids or cell types. Recent developments in the microfluidics field have seen the integration of microfluidic devices with magnetophoresis: the migration of particles by a magnetic field. This can be accomplished by sending a fluid containing at least one magnetic component through a microfluidic channel that has a magnet positioned along the length of the channel. This creates a magnetic field inside the microfluidic channel which draws magnetically active substances towards it, effectively separating the magnetic and non-magnetic components of the fluid. This technique can be readily utilized in industrial settings where the fluid at hand already contains magnetically active material. For example, a handful of metallic impurities can find their way into certain consumable liquids, namely milk and other dairy products. Conveniently, in the case of milk, many of these metal contaminants exhibit paramagnetism. Therefore, before packaging, milk can be flowed through channels with magnetic gradients as a means of purifying out the metal contaminants.

Other, more research-oriented applications of microfluidic-assisted magnetophoresis are numerous and are generally targeted towards cell separation. The general way this is accomplished involves several steps. First, a paramagnetic substance (usually micro/nanoparticles or a paramagnetic fluid) needs to be functionalized to target the cell type of interest. This can be accomplished by identifying a transmembranal protein unique to the cell type of interest and subsequently functionalizing magnetic particles with the complementary antigen or antibody. Once the magnetic particles are functionalized, they are dispersed in a cell mixture where they bind to only the cells of interest. The resulting cell/particle mixture can then be flowed through a microfluidic device with a magnetic field to separate the targeted cells from the rest.

Conversely, microfluidic-assisted magnetophoresis may be used to facilitate efficient mixing within microdroplets or plugs. To accomplish this, microdroplets are injected with paramagnetic nanoparticles and are flowed through a straight channel which passes through rapidly alternating magnetic fields. This causes the magnetic particles to be quickly pushed from side to side within the droplet and results in the mixing of the microdroplet contents. This eliminates the need for tedious engineering considerations that are necessary for traditional, channel-based droplet mixing. Other research has also shown that the label-free separation of cells may be possible by suspending cells in a paramagnetic fluid and taking advantage of the magneto-Archimedes effect. While this does eliminate the complexity of particle functionalization, more research is needed to fully understand the magneto-Archimedes phenomenon and how it can be used to this end. This is not an exhaustive list of the various applications of microfluidic-assisted magnetophoresis; the above examples merely highlight the versatility of this separation technique in both current and future applications.

Key application areas

Microfluidic structures include micropneumatic systems, i.e. microsystems for the handling of off-chip fluids (liquid pumps, gas valves, etc.), and microfluidic structures for the on-chip handling of nanoliter (nl) and picoliter (pl) volumes.  To date, the most successful commercial application of microfluidics is the inkjet printhead. Additionally, microfluidic manufacturing advances mean that makers can produce the devices in low-cost plastics and automatically verify part quality.

Advances in microfluidics technology are revolutionizing molecular biology procedures for enzymatic analysis (e.g.,  glucose and lactate assays), DNA analysis (e.g., polymerase chain reaction and high-throughput sequencing), proteomics, and in chemical synthesis. The basic idea of microfluidic biochips is to integrate assay operations such as detection, as well as sample pre-treatment and sample preparation on one chip.

An emerging application area for biochips is clinical pathology, especially the immediate point-of-care diagnosis of diseases. In addition, microfluidics-based devices, capable of continuous sampling and real-time testing of air/water samples for biochemical toxins and other dangerous pathogens, can serve as an always-on "bio-smoke alarm" for early warning.

Microfluidic technology has led to the creation of powerful tools for biologists to control the complete cellular environment, leading to new questions and discoveries. Many diverse advantages of this technology for microbiology are listed below:
 General single cell studies including growth 
 Cellular aging: microfluidic devices such as the "mother machine" allow tracking of thousands of individual cells for many generations until they die 
 Microenvironmental control: ranging from mechanical environment  to chemical environment 
 Precise spatiotemporal concentration gradients by incorporating multiple chemical inputs to a single device 
 Force measurements of adherent cells or confined chromosomes: objects trapped in a microfluidic device can be directly manipulated using optical tweezers or other force-generating methods 
 Confining cells and exerting controlled forces by coupling with external force-generation methods such as Stokes flow, optical tweezer, or controlled deformation of the PDMS (Polydimethylsiloxane) device 
 Electric field integration 
 Plant on a chip and plant tissue culture 
 Antibiotic resistance: microfluidic devices can be used as heterogeneous environments for microorganisms. In a heterogeneous environment, it is easier for a microorganism to evolve. This can be useful for testing the acceleration of evolution of a microorganism / for testing the development of antibiotic resistance.

Some of these areas are further elaborated in the sections below:

DNA chips (microarrays)

Early biochips were based on the idea of a DNA microarray, e.g., the GeneChip DNAarray from Affymetrix, which is a piece of glass, plastic or silicon substrate, on which pieces of DNA (probes) are affixed in a microscopic array. Similar to a DNA microarray, a protein array is a miniature array where a multitude of different capture agents, most frequently monoclonal antibodies, are deposited on a chip surface; they are used to determine the presence and/or amount of proteins in biological samples, e.g., blood. A drawback of DNA and protein arrays is that they are neither reconfigurable nor scalable after manufacture. Digital microfluidics has been described as a means for carrying out Digital PCR.

Molecular biology
In addition to microarrays, biochips have been designed for two-dimensional electrophoresis, transcriptome analysis, and PCR amplification. Other applications include various electrophoresis and liquid chromatography applications for proteins and DNA, cell separation, in particular, blood cell separation, protein analysis, cell manipulation and analysis including cell viability analysis  and microorganism capturing.

Evolutionary biology

By combining microfluidics with landscape ecology and nanofluidics, a nano/micro fabricated fluidic landscape can be constructed by building local patches of bacterial habitat and connecting them by dispersal corridors. The resulting landscapes can be used as physical implementations of an adaptive landscape,  by generating a spatial mosaic of patches of opportunity distributed in space and time. The patchy nature of these fluidic landscapes allows for the study of adapting bacterial cells in a metapopulation system. The evolutionary ecology of these bacterial systems in these synthetic ecosystems allows for using biophysics to address questions in evolutionary biology.

Cell behavior

The ability to create precise and carefully controlled chemoattractant gradients makes microfluidics the ideal tool to study motility, chemotaxis and the ability to evolve / develop resistance to antibiotics in small populations of microorganisms and in a short period of time. These microorganisms including bacteria and the broad range of organisms that form the marine microbial loop, responsible for regulating much of the oceans' biogeochemistry.

Microfluidics has also greatly aided the study of durotaxis by facilitating the creation of durotactic (stiffness) gradients.

Cellular biophysics

By rectifying the motion of individual swimming bacteria,  microfluidic structures can be used to extract mechanical motion from a population of motile bacterial cells.  This way, bacteria-powered rotors can be built.

Optics
The merger of microfluidics and optics is typical known as optofluidics. Examples of optofluidic devices are tunable microlens arrays and optofluidic microscopes.

Microfluidic flow enables fast sample throughput, automated imaging of large sample populations, as well as 3D capabilities. or superresolution.

High Performance Liquid Chromatography (HPLC) 
HPLC  in the field of microfluidics comes in two different forms. Early designs included running liquid through the HPLC column then transferring the eluted liquid to microfluidic chips and attaching HPLC columns to the microfluidic chip directly. The early methods had the advantage of easier detection from certain machines like those that measure fluorescence. More recent designs have fully integrated HPLC columns into microfluidic chips. The main advantage of integrating HPLC columns into microfluidic devices is the smaller form factor that can be achieved, which allows for additional features to be combined within one microfluidic chip. Integrated chips can also be fabricated from multiple different materials, including glass and polyimide which are quite different from the standard material of PDMS used in many different droplet-based microfluidic devices. This is an important feature because different applications of HPLC microfluidic chips may call for different pressures. PDMS fails in comparison for high-pressure uses compared to glass and polyimide. High versatility of HPLC integration ensures robustness by avoiding connections and fittings between the column and chip. The ability to build off said designs in the future allows the field of microfluidics to continue expanding its potential applications.

The potential applications surrounding integrated HPLC columns within microfluidic devices have proven expansive over the last 10–15 years. The integration of such columns allows for experiments to be run where materials were in low availability or very expensive, like in biological analysis of proteins. This reduction in reagent volumes allows for new experiments like single-cell protein analysis, which due to size limitations of prior devices, previously came with great difficulty. The coupling of HPLC-chip devices with other spectrometry methods like mass-spectrometry allow for enhanced confidence in identification of desired species, like proteins. Microfluidic chips have also been created with internal delay-lines that allow for gradient generation to further improve HPLC, which can reduce the need for further separations. Some other practical applications of integrated HPLC chips include the determination of drug presence in a person through their hair and the labeling of peptides through reverse phase liquid chromatography.

Acoustic droplet ejection (ADE)

Acoustic droplet ejection uses a pulse of ultrasound to move low volumes of fluids (typically nanoliters or picoliters) without any physical contact. This technology focuses acoustic energy into a fluid sample to eject droplets as small as a millionth of a millionth of a litre (picoliter = 10−12 litre). ADE technology is a very gentle process, and it can be used to transfer proteins, high molecular weight DNA and live cells without damage or loss of viability. This feature makes the technology suitable for a wide variety of applications including proteomics and cell-based assays.

Fuel cells

Microfluidic fuel cells can use laminar flow to separate the fuel and its oxidant to control the interaction of the two fluids without the physical barrier that conventional fuel cells require.

Astrobiology 
To understand the prospects for life to exist elsewhere in the universe, astrobiologists are interested in measuring the chemical composition of extraplanetary bodies. Because of their small size and wide-ranging functionality, microfluidic devices are uniquely suited for these remote sample analyses.  From an extraterrestrial sample, the organic content can be assessed using microchip capillary electrophoresis and selective fluorescent dyes.  These devices are capable of detecting amino acids, peptides, fatty acids, and simple aldehydes, ketones, and thiols. These analyses coupled together could allow powerful detection of the key components of life, and hopefully inform our search for functioning extraterrestrial life.

Food Science
Microfluidic techniques such as droplet microfluidics, paper microfluidics, and lab-on-a-chip are used in the realm of food science in a variety of categories. Research in nutrition, food processing, and food safety benefit from microfluidic technique because experiments can be done with less reagents.
 
Food processing requires the ability to enable shelf stability in foods, such as emulsions or additions of preservatives. Techniques such as droplet microfluidics are used to create emulsions that are more controlled and complex than those created by traditional homogenization due to the precision of droplets that is achievable. Using microfluidics for emulsions is also more energy efficient compared to homogenization in which “only 5% of the supplied energy is used to generate the emulsion, with the rest dissipated as heat” . Although these methods have benefits, they currently lack the ability to be produced at large scale that is needed for commercialization. Microfluidics are also used in research as they allow for innovation in food chemistry and food processing. An example in food engineering research is a novel micro-3D-printed device fabricated to research production of droplets for potential food processing industry use, particularly in work with enhancing emulsions.
 
Paper and droplet microfluidics allow for devices that can detect small amounts of unwanted bacteria or chemicals, making them useful in food safety and analysis. Paper-based microfluidic devices are often referred to as microfluidic paper-based analytical devices (µPADs) and can detect such things as nitrate, preservatives, or antibiotics  in meat by a colorimetric reaction that can be detected with a smartphone. These methods are being researched because they use less reactants, space, and time compared to traditional techniques such as liquid chromatography. µPADs also make home detection tests possible , which is of interest to those with allergies and intolerances. In addition to paper-based methods, research demonstrates droplet-based microfluidics shows promise in drastically shortening the time necessary to confirm viable bacterial contamination in agricultural waters in the domestic and international food industry.

Future directions

Microfluidics for personalized cancer treatment 
Personalized cancer treatment is an tuned method based on the patient's diagnosis and background. Microfluidic technology offers sensitive detection with higher throughput, as well as reduced time and costs. For personalized cancer treatment, tumor composition and drug sensitivities are very important.

A patient's drug response can be predicted based on the status of biomarkers, or the severity and progression of the disease can be predicted based on the atypical presence of specific cells. Drop-qPCR is a droplet microfluidic technology in which droplets are transported in a reusable capillary and alternately flow through two areas maintained at different constant temperatures and fluorescence detection. It can be efficient with a low contamination risk to detect Her2. A digital droplet‐based PCR method can be used to detect the KRAS mutations with TaqMan probes, to enhance detection of the mutative gene ratio. In addition, accurate prediction of postoperative disease progression in breast or prostate cancer patients is essential for determining post-surgery treatment. A simple microfluidic chamber, coated with a carefully formulated extracellular matrix mixture. is used for cells obtained from tumor biopsy after 72 hours of growth and a thorough evaluation of cells by imaging.

Microfluidics is also suitable for circulating tumor cells (CTCs) and non-CTCs liquid biopsy analysis. Beads conjugate to anti‐epithelial cell adhesion molecule (EpCAM) antibodies for positive selection in the CTCs isolation chip (iCHIP). CTCs can also be detected by using the acidification of the tumor microenvironment and the difference in membrane capacitance. CTCs are isolated from blood by a microfluidic device, and are cultured on-chip, which can be a method to capture more biological information in a single analysis. For example, it can be used to test the cell survival rate of 40 different drugs or drug combinations. Tumor‐derived extracellular vesicles can be isolated from urine and detected by an integrated double‐filtration microfluidic device; they also can be isolated from blood and detected by electrochemical sensing method with a two‐level amplification enzymatic assay.

Tumor materials can directly be used for detection through microfluidic devices. To screen primary cells for drugs, it is often necessary to distinguish cancerous cells from non-cancerous cells. A microfluidic chip based on the capacity of cells to pass small constrictions can sort the cell types, metastases. Droplet‐based microfluidic devices have the potential to screen different drugs or combinations of drugs, directly on the primary tumor sample with high accuracy. To improve this strategy, the microfluidic program with a sequential manner of drug cocktails, coupled with fluorescent barcodes, is more efficient. Another advanced strategy is detecting growth rates of single-cell by using suspended microchannel resonators, which can predict drug sensitivities of rare CTCs.

Microfluidics devices also can simulate the tumor microenvironment, to help to test anticancer drugs. Microfluidic devices with 2D or 3D cell cultures can be used to analyze spheroids for different cancer systems (such as lung cancer and ovarian cancer), and are essential for multiple anti-cancer drugs and toxicity tests. This strategy can be improved by increasing the throughput and production of spheroids. For example, one droplet-based microfluidic device for 3D cell culture produces 500 spheroids per chip. These spheroids can be cultured longer in different surroundings to analyze and monitor. The other advanced technology is organs‐on‐a‐chip, and it can be used to simulate several organs to determine the drug metabolism and activity based on vessels mimicking, as well as mimic pH, oxygen... to analyze the relationship between drugs and human organ surroundings.

A recent strategy is single-cell chromatin immunoprecipitation (ChiP)‐Sequencing in droplets, which operates by combining droplet‐based single cell RNA sequencing with DNA‐barcoded antibodies, possibly to explore the tumor heterogeneity by the genotype and phenotype to select the personalized anti-cancer drugs and prevent the cancer relapse.

Overall, microfluidic techniques have a strong potential for personalized cancer treatment and bringing in new methods for future cancer therapies. However, challenges remain to integrate these methods with clinical treatment, based on the amount of genetic or biomarker's information, unreliable equipment, or difficulty of interfacing with clinical operations.

Microfluidic drug assays:

On-chip characterization:

Microfluidics in the classroom: On-chip acid-base titrations

Sepsis detection in minutes not days.

Unlocking multi-angle imaging for microfluidic devices

Notable people 
 

Hang Lu, Professor of Chemical and Biomolecular Engineering at the Georgia Institute of Technology

See also 

 Advanced Simulation Library
 Droplet-based microfluidics
 Fluidics
 Microphysiometry
 Micropumps
 Microvalves
 Induced-charge electrokinetics
 Lab-on-a-chip
 uFluids@Home
 Paper-based microfluidics
 Microfluidic cell culture
 Microfluidic Modulation Spectroscopy

References

Further reading

Review papers

Books

 
 Folch, Albert. Hidden in Plain Sight: The History, Science, and Engineering of Microfluidic Technology (MIT Press, 2022) online review

Education

Microfluidics
Fluid dynamics
Nanotechnology
Biotechnology
Gas technologies